The Battle of the Inn was fought in 913, when a Hungarian raiding army, at their return from plunder attacks against Bavaria, Swabia, and Northern Burgundy, faced the combined army of Arnulf, Duke of Bavaria, Counts Erchanger and Burchard of Swabia, and Lord Udalrich, who defeated them at Aschbach by the River Inn.

Sources
The skirmish at the Inn River is mentioned by the Annales Alamannici (continued by Hermann of Reichenau in the 11th century), the Annales iuvavenses, the Continuatio Treverensis chronici Reginonis (the continuation of Regino of Prüm's Chronicon, who wrote at Trier in 967), and the Annales Sangallenses maiores (another continuation of the Annales Alamannici, compiled in the Abbey of Saint Gall). The last one suggests that "the entire [Hungarian] army was destroyed, but thirty men" ["nisi 30 viros"]. Historian Károly Szabó argued this figure is a result of a subsequent insertion. The battle is marginally also mentioned by the Annales Sancti Quintini Viromandensis.

Background
The 16th-century humanist historian and philologist Johannes Aventinus' Annalium Boiorum libri septem (1523) contains more details about the circumstances of the battle. His work is mostly based on manuscripts written at the time of the battle, but since lost. Aventinus mentioned the event in two paragraphs. At first, he wrote: "The Hungarians demand tax payment from Arnulf, who refuses it. After that they invade the Bavarians. Arnulf surrounds and slaughters them". In the second paragraph, Aventinus has more detailed the events:

Aventinus' narrative confirmed that Conrad was obliged to pay tribute to the Hungarians, as well as his predecessor Louis the Child, together with the Swabian, Frankish, Bavarian and Saxonian dukes, after the Battle of Rednitz in June 910. According to the chronicler, paying the regular tax was the "price of peace". After the western border was pacified, the Hungarians used the Eastern provinces of the Kingdom of Germany as puffer zone and transfer area to execute their long-range military campaigns to far West. Bavaria allowed Hungarians into their realm to continue their journey and the Bavarian–Hungarian relations were described as neutral during this time. Following the disastrous Battle of Pressburg (907), Arnulf strengthened his power through confiscation of church lands and the secularization of numerous monastery estates to raise funds to finance a re-organized defense, which earned him the nickname "the Bad" by medieval chroniclers. Despite "peace" which was guaranteed by regular tax payments, he was faced with constant raids from the Hungarians, when they entered the border or returned to the Pannonian Basin after a distant campaign. However the energetic and combative Arnulf already defeated a small Hungarian raiding contingent at Pocking near the Rott river on 11 August 909, after they withdrew from a campaign where they burnt the two churches of Freising. In 910, he also beat another minor Hungarian unit at Neuching, which returned from the victorious Battle of Lechfeld and other plundering attacks.

Historian István Bóna described the battle as a "destruction of a gang of robbers" who arbitrarily broke the conditions of peace. Other historians, who argue in favour of the lack of central organization of military campaigns, consider the Hungarian plunder attack in Bavaria after returning their war from West, which resulted Battle of the Inn, was merely a private action by a tribal chieftain or a small unit. Historian Levente Igaz argues the Bavarian was able to achieve success against the Hungarians only if they returned from a prosperous remote campaign with their booty, prisoners, and livestock which slowed down their marching. It is possible that after years of peace and stabilization, Arnulf felt strong enough to create new favorable conditions for his forced alliance with the Hungarians. After his disobedient behavior, the Hungarians launched a punitive expedition against his duchy, provoking a war. His conscious strategy was confirmed by the report of the Annales Alamannici, which wrote Arnulf concluded an alliance with his relatives, Swabian counts Erchanger and Burchard, and an influential lord Udalrich against the Hungarians. Aventinus' work also suggests that Arnulf used the Hungarians' "own military method" when ordered they soldiers to hide and imitating retreat, confirming a military cultural exchange at the Bavarian–Hungarian border.

Reconstruction

Igaz argues the German allied forces attacked the Hungarians' camp near Altötting or Asbach, beyond the valley of Inn. As there is no report of any Hungarian military expeditions in the next year (914), several historians considered Arnulf's attack as "the first truly significant defeat" to the Hungarians since their series of invasions against Western Europe, which preceded the defeats at Riade (933) and Lechfeld (955). However, as Igaz points out, there were other examples when a small Hungarian unit was stalked and massacred, for instance, as Ekkehard preserved, when drunk and tired Hungarian invaders were perished by local at the village of Friccowe.

References

Sources

Inn
Inn
913
Inn
Battles in Bavaria